Stanley Bowles (born 24 December 1948) is an English former professional footballer who as a player in the 1970s was known for his skills as a forward, and also gained a reputation as one of the game's great non-conformists and mavericks.

Club career
Bowles was born in Collyhurst, Manchester, Lancashire. He began his career as an apprentice at Manchester City, although his fiery temper resulted in his falling out with coach Malcolm Allison and being released after a series of off-field incidents. After a brief and unsuccessful stay at Bury, he was signed by Ernie Tagg, manager of Crewe Alexandra, then in the Fourth Division, where his skill caught the eye of a number of bigger clubs. In October 1971 he was signed by Carlisle United, at the time a Second Division club, and scored 13 goals in 36 appearances for the club. After a managerial change at the club, he was sold to Queens Park Rangers (QPR) for £110,000 in September 1972.

He replaced in the team a previous QPR folk hero, Rodney Marsh, who had been transferred to Bowles' first club Manchester City only six months before. Bowles took over Marsh's number 10 shirt, which other players had been reluctant to wear in fear of being compared unfavourably to the mercurial Marsh. Bowles had no such qualms about taking the shirt, and joked that, coming from the North, he had never really heard of Marsh.

Bowles was often regarded as something of a character both on and off the pitch. Bowles has been known to cite a notable incident in his playing days involving the famous FA Cup trophy. Having won the FA Cup competition four days prior, Sunderland were parading the trophy at Roker Park on 9 May 1973 when they met QPR in the old Division 2. The trophy had been placed on a table at the side of the pitch when Bowles tore straight across the park and claims to have kicked the ball at it full speed, sending the Cup flying through the air. According to Stan, the crowd predictably went ballistic, but he had the last laugh by scoring two goals in the match which ended in a pitch invasion. Some reports suggest that some of the QPR players had laid bets as to who could hit the trophy first. However this version of events has been disputed and, according to Gordon Jago (QPR's manager at the time), it was Bowles's teammate, defender Tony Hazell, who struck the cup with an accidental clearance.

Bowles spent just over seven years at QPR, playing a central role in arguably the club's greatest ever team, that which finished as league runners-up in 1975–76 under Dave Sexton. A 2004 fans poll saw him voted the club's all-time greatest player. In 1979, Bowles fell out with QPR's new manager, Tommy Docherty. Bowles responded to Docherty's plea of "You can trust me, Stan" with "I'd rather trust my chickens with Colonel Sanders". Docherty made Bowles train with the reserves for nearly six months, before selling Bowles to Nottingham Forest in December 1979. Despite the fallout between Docherty and Bowles, Docherty continued to play Bowles for QPR right up until he was sold to Nottingham Forest.

At Nottingham Forest, Bowles failed to settle under the management of Brian Clough and he ruled himself out of the 1980 European Cup Final after Clough refused to allow Bowles to play in John Robertson's testimonial. Bowles was essentially understudy to the UK's first £1 million signing Trevor Francis during his one season at the City Ground, and before the season was out Clough was already targeting Coventry City's top scorer Ian Wallace as his replacement. Bowles was then sold to Leyton Orient for £100,000 after making only 23 appearances in all competitions. He joined Brentford the following year and remained at the club until retiring at the end of the 1982–83 season. Bowles came out of retirement to briefly rejoin the club on a non-contract basis during 1983–84 season, before retiring again in February 1984. He received a testimonial in 1987, earning £17,000. After retirement from the professional game, he continued to play at non-league level for Epping Town.

His 1996 autobiography revealed the extent of his drinking, womanising and gambling during his playing days, and also helped to secure a role as a pundit on Sky Sports, where he again replaced Rodney Marsh. Bowles is also the life chairman of the Queens Park Rangers supporters group L.S.A (Loyal Supporters Association).

A cult icon, he had the honour of a song bearing his name being released as a single by the group The Others. Bowles has also written betting columns in the national press and a column in 'lads' mag' Loaded and also appeared on the after-dinner-speaker circuit. He was also the personal favourite player of John Barnes.

International career
Bowles made his international debut against Portugal in April 1974 in Sir Alf Ramsey's last match in charge. Despite his unquestionable ability and consistently high-level league performances, he won only five caps for England, all while playing for QPR (playing for three managers: Sir Alf Ramsey, Joe Mercer and Don Revie) and scored his only international goal in a 2–0 win over Wales at Ninian Park in 1974.

Personal life
Bowles is a cousin of Paul Bowles. On 20 June 2015, Stan Bowles was reported to be a sufferer from Alzheimer's disease. On 22 August 2015, Queens Park Rangers honoured Bowles as he was presented to the crowd at Loftus Road before their game against Rotherham United.

Honours 
 Brentford Supporters' Player of the Year: 1981–82

References

External links
 A Carlisle United fans tribute
 Bowles comments on The Others' tribute song
 Profile and career stats from Crewe Alexandra site
 Booze birds bust ups and betting from gambling site
 BRIAN VINER INTERVIEWS - Stan Bowles: 'Clough, Brooking, Eriksson' 13 October 2005
 Football: Stan Bowles book launch 7 September 1996
BBC Sport interview with Bowles about his career and the prospects for QPR in season 2008-09

English footballers
English association football commentators
England international footballers
Manchester City F.C. players
Bury F.C. players
Crewe Alexandra F.C. players
Carlisle United F.C. players
Queens Park Rangers F.C. players
Nottingham Forest F.C. players
Leyton Orient F.C. players
Brentford F.C. players
People from Collyhurst
1948 births
Living people
English Football League players
English Football League representative players
Association football forwards
Association football midfielders
People with Alzheimer's disease
Footballers from Manchester